Jerlochovice is a cadastral area in Fulnek, Nový Jičín District, Czech Republic. It covers an area of approximately 8.76 km2 and mostly lies in Moravia although some parts are in Silesia. The population as of 2001 was 653.

Notable people
 August von Gödrich, German cyclist

References

Populated places in Nový Jičín District
Neighbourhoods in the Czech Republic